The Persistence of Vision is a  1978 collection of science fiction stories by American writer John Varley.

The collection was also published in the United Kingdom under the title In the Hall of the Martian Kings.

Contents
The collection includes nine stories:
 "The Phantom of Kansas", originally published in Galaxy, February 1976.
 "Air Raid", originally published in Isaac Asimov's Science Fiction Magazine, Spring 1977. Varley later expanded this into the novel Millennium.
 "Retrograde Summer", originally published in The Magazine of Fantasy & Science Fiction, February 1975.
 "The Black Hole Passes", originally published in The Magazine of Fantasy & Science Fiction, June 1975.
 "In the Hall of the Martian Kings", originally published in The Magazine of Fantasy & Science Fiction, February 1977.
 "In the Bowl", originally published in The Magazine of Fantasy & Science Fiction, December 1975.
 "Gotta Sing, Gotta Dance", originally published in Galaxy, July 1976.
 "Overdrawn at the Memory Bank", originally published in Galaxy, May 1976. Adapted into a 1983 television movie.
 "The Persistence of Vision", originally published in The Magazine of Fantasy & Science Fiction, March 1978.

Awards
The Persistence of Vision won the 1979 Locus Award for Best Single-Author Collection.

The title story won the 1978 Nebula Award, the 1979 Hugo Award, and the 1979 Locus Award in the novella category.

References

External links

Eight Worlds series
1978 short story collections